Jaime Turégano González, simply known as Jaime (born 20 February 1992), is a Spanish professional footballer who plays as a left back.

Football career
Born in Madrid, Jaime made his senior debuts with local Atlético de Pinto in the 2010–11 season, in the Tercera División. On 16 July 2013 he rescinded his link with the club and joined neighbouring AD Alcorcón, being initially assigned to the reserves also in the fourth level.

On 18 January 2014 Jaime made his first appearance with the main squad, playing the last four minutes of a 4–0 away rout of CD Tenerife in the Segunda División. On 18 August he moved to CD Lealtad of the Segunda División B.

References

External links
 
 
 

1992 births
Living people
Footballers from Madrid
Spanish footballers
Association football defenders
Segunda División players
Tercera División players
AD Alcorcón B players
AD Alcorcón footballers
CD Lealtad players